Fotballklubben Voss is a Norwegian association football club from Vossevangen, Hordaland.

It was founded on 26 September 1921.

The women's football team currently plays in the First Division, the second tier of Norwegian football. The men's football team currently plays in the Third Division, the fourth tier of Norwegian football. In 2005 it contested a playoff to win promotion to the Second Division, but lost to Askøy FK. In 2010 it once more won its section of the Third Division, but again failed to win promotion, losing in the play-offs against Austevoll.

As the last round of 2013 finished, FBK Voss Men fell down to the Fourth Division.

Recent history

Women's team
{|class="wikitable"
|-bgcolor="#efefef"
! Season
! 
! Pos.
! Pl.
! W
! D
! L
! GS
! GA
! P
!Cup
!Notes
|-
|2001
|
| |
|||||||
||||||
|1st round
|
|-
|2002
|
| |
|||||||
||||||
|2nd round
|
|-
|2003
|
| |
|||||||
||||||
|1st round
|
|-
|2004
|2. Division
|align=right |5
|align=right|18||align=right|6||align=right|5||align=right|7
|align=right|32||align=right|42||align=right|23
|2nd round
|
|-
|2005
|2. Division
|align=right bgcolor=bronze|3
|align=right|18||align=right|11||align=right|4||align=right|3
|align=right|50||align=right|16||align=right|37
|1st round
|
|-
|2006
|2. Division
|align=right bgcolor=silver|2
|align=right|18||align=right|15||align=right|0||align=right|3
|align=right|52||align=right|19||align=right|45
|2nd round
|
|-
|2007
|2. Division
|align=right bgcolor=gold|1
|align=right|18||align=right|14||align=right|2||align=right|2
|align=right|63||align=right|16||align=right|44
|2nd round
|Promoted to 1. Division
|-
|2008
|1. Division
|align=right |7
|align=right|18||align=right|5||align=right|5||align=right|8
|align=right|14||align=right|26||align=right|20
|2nd round
|
|-
|2009
|1. Division
|align=right |10
|align=right|22||align=right|5||align=right|5||align=right|12
|align=right|25||align=right|38||align=right|20
|2nd round
|
|-
|2010
|1. Division
|align=right |7
|align=right|22||align=right|7||align=right|7||align=right|8
|align=right|28||align=right|32||align=right|28
|1st round
|-
|2011
|1. Division
|align=right |8
|align=right|20||align=right|4||align=right|7||align=right|9
|align=right|16||align=right|34||align=right|19
|3rd round
|
|-
|2012 
|1. Division
|align=right bgcolor=red|12
|align=right|22||align=right|2||align=right|1||align=right|19
|align=right|8||align=right|60||align=right|7
|2nd round
|The team ended at the bottom of the table, but avoided relegationas several other teams withdrew from the league.
|-
|2013 (in progress)
|1. Division
|align=right |11
| align="right" |18||align=right|1||align=right|4|| align="right" |13
| align="right" |13|| align="right" |50||align=right|7
|2nd round
|
|}

Men's team
{|class="wikitable"
|-bgcolor="#efefef"
! Season
! 
! Pos.
! Pl.
! W
! D
! L
! GS
! GA
! P
!Cup
!Notes
|-
|2001
|4. divisjon
|align=right bgcolor=#DDFFDD| 2
|align=right|22||align=right|16||align=right|2||align=right|4
|align=right|73||align=right|30||align=right|50
|
|Promoted to the 3. divisjon
|-
|2002
|3. divisjon
|align=right |7
|align=right|22||align=right|8||align=right|7||align=right|7
|align=right|43||align=right|42||align=right|31
|
|
|-
|2003
|3. divisjon
|align=right |7
|align=right|22||align=right|8||align=right|7||align=right|7
|align=right|46||align=right|41||align=right|31
|Second qualifying round
|
|-
|2004
|3. divisjon
|align=right |7
|align=right|22||align=right|9||align=right|3||align=right|10
|align=right|46||align=right|50||align=right|30
|First qualifying round
|
|-
|2005
|3. divisjon
|align=right |1
|align=right|22||align=right|13||8||align=right|1
|align=right|52||align=right|26||align=right|47
|First round
|Lost playoffs for promotion
|-
|2006
|3. divisjon
|align=right |3
|align=right|22||align=right|14||align=right|3||align=right|5
|align=right|60||align=right|30||align=right|45
|Second round
|
|-
|2007
|3. divisjon
|align=right |2
|align=right|22||align=right|17||align=right|1||align=right|4
|align=right|82||align=right|34||align=right|52
|Second qualifying round
|
|-
|2008
|3. divisjon
|align=right |2
|align=right|22||align=right|16||align=right|1||align=right|5
|align=right|70||align=right|35||align=right|49
|First round
|
|-
|2009
|3. divisjon
|align=right |5
|align=right|22||align=right|9||align=right|4||align=right|9
|align=right|45||align=right|35||align=right|31
|First qualifying round
|
|-
|2010
|3. divisjon
|align=right |1
|align=right|22||align=right|16||align=right|3||align=right|3
|align=right|60||align=right|23||align=right|51
|First round
|Lost playoffs for promotion
|-
|2011
|3. divisjon
|align=right |3
|align=right|26||align=right|13||align=right|5||align=right|8
|align=right|56||align=right|36||align=right|44
|Second qualifying round
|
|-
|2012
|3. divisjon
|align=right |4
|align=right|26||align=right|14||align=right|2||align=right|10
|align=right|68||align=right|61||align=right|44
|First round
|
|-
|2013
|3. divisjon
|colspan="8"|in progress
|Second qualifying round
|
|}

References

External links
 Official site 

Football clubs in Norway
Sport in Hordaland
Voss
Association football clubs established in 1921
1921 establishments in Norway